Babile is a town located in East Hararghe, Oromia. It is inhabited mostly by Oromo peoples. It's the administrative center of Babille woreda.

Babille woreda is located 700 90' North Latitude and 430 00' East Longitude. It shares boundary with other woredas of the Somali region and Fadis Woreda of Oromia regional state. The total size of the Woreda is about 1,325 km2. It is divided into 17 kebeles and 42 sub-kebeles. The average temperature is 26.5 Celsius with uneven rainfall distribution. Babille is known for its hot springs, mineral water and elephant sanctuary. Often, the inhabitants come into conflicts with the neighboring Somali communities over the control of the sanctuary.

It is city of somali special geri koombe clan

Overview
Located on the main road between Harar and Jigjiga, Babille is reported to have had telephone service by 1967.

Babille is known for its hot springs, mineral water and the Babille Elephant Sanctuary.  The Dakhata Valley (also called the "Valley of Marvels"), known for its rock formations and birdlife, lies seven kilometers from the town. Also nearby is the pass known as the Babille Gap, which has been used at least twice as a strongpoint held against invaders: once by the Italians in 1941 during the Second World War, and later by the Ethiopian army in 1977 during the Ogaden War against the Somali army.

Demographics
The total population of the woreda is about 92,702 of whom 50,059 are males and 42,643 are females with average household size of 7.5 persons. The people are dominantly agro-pastoral with 70% of the total population living on this mode of life. Of the remaining population, 15% are agricultural, 10% are pastoral, and 5% petty traders. Maize and sorghum are staple crops and livestock includes cattle, goats, sheep, and camels. 

Based on figures from the Central Statistical Agency in 2005, this town has an estimated total population of 16,454 of whom 8,386 are men and 8,068 are women. The 1994 national census reported this town had a total population of 9,195 of whom 4,548 were men and 4,647 were women. It is the largest town in Babile Woreda.

References

Cities and towns in Oromia Region
Ethiopia
Cities and towns in Ethiopia